Joe Bailey is a Canadian former ice hockey player. He played in the 1966–67 season in the top tier of the Ontario Hockey Association with the Junior "A" Niagara Falls Flyers.

Bailey was selected by the Boston Bruins in the 1st round (4th overall) of the 1965 NHL Amateur Draft, but never played a game in the National Hockey League.

References

External links

Possibly living people
Year of birth missing
Boston Bruins draft picks
Canadian ice hockey forwards
National Hockey League first-round draft picks